Anke Maria Flor Van dermeersch (born 27 October 1972) is a Belgian politician, former model and beauty pageant titleholder who was crowned Miss Belgium 1991 and represented Belgium at Miss World 1991 and Miss Universe 1992.

Pageantry
Anke Van dermeersch rose to attention in Belgium during a modelling career, becoming Miss Belgium in 1992 and representing her country at Miss World 1991 and Miss Universe 1992.

Political career
Van dermeersch became a directly elected Belgian senator in 2003 for the far-right party Vlaams Blok and later Vlaams Belang. Since 2019, she has been a member of the Flemish parliament. She has also been the leader of a counter-jihad group called Women Against Islamisation.

Personal life
She is married with two children and trained as a lawyer.

Notes

1972 births
21st-century Belgian politicians
21st-century Belgian women politicians
Belgian beauty pageant winners
Belgian female models
Belgian women lawyers
Counter-jihad activists
Models from Antwerp
Living people
Members of the Belgian Federal Parliament
Miss Universe 1992 contestants
Miss World 1991 delegates
Politicians from Antwerp
Vlaams Belang politicians
Miss Belgium winners
21st-century Belgian lawyers
21st-century women lawyers
Beauty queen-politicians